Kirin may refer to:

Mythology and fiction
 Qilin or Kirin, a mythical creature known in various East Asian cultures
 Ki-rin (Dungeons & Dragons), a type of monster in D&D
 Kirin, a type of monster in Monster Hunter
 Kirin, a type of creature in the My Little Pony: Friendship Is Magic series

Places
 Jilin or Kirin, a province in northeastern China
 Jilin City or Kirin, a city in the province of Jilin, China
 Kirin, Croatia, a settlement in Vrginmost

Companies and products
 Subsidiaries of Kirin Holdings:
 Kirin Company, a Japanese beverages company
 Kyowa Kirin, a Japanese pharmaceutical company
 Brasil Kirin, a Brazilian brewery and beverage company
 Kirin, a series of SoCs produced by HiSilicon

Sports
 Kirin Cup Soccer, an association football tournament organised in Japan
 Kirin Open, a Japanese golf tournament from 1974 to 2001
 One of three shogi pieces in large shogi Kirin variants:
 Chu shogi, which uses one piece per player
 Dai shogi, which uses one piece per player
 Taikyoku shogi, which uses the Kirin (麒麟) and Kirin-master (麟師) pieces

Other uses
 Kirin (manga), a 1987 Japanese manga series
 Kirin language or Kili, a Tungusic language of Russia and China

People with the name
 Ivica Kirin (born 1970), former Interior Minister of Croatia
 Kirin J. Callinan (born 1986), Australian singer and songwriter
 Kirin Kiki (1943–2018), Japanese TV and film actress
 Kirin Narayan (born 1959), Indian-born American anthropologist and writer
 Kirin Kotecha, a character in Emmerdale

See also
 Girin (disambiguation)
 Keirin, a form of motor-paced cycle racing
 Kirin no Tsubasa, a 2012 Japanese film
 Kirino (disambiguation)
 Kylin (disambiguation)
 Qilin (disambiguation)
 Xilin (disambiguation)